This is a list of earthquakes in 1916. Only magnitude 6.0 or greater earthquakes appear on the list. Lower magnitude events are included if they have caused death, injury or damage. Events which occurred in remote areas will be excluded from the list as they wouldn't have generated significant media interest. All dates are listed according to UTC time. Remarkably despite the large number of 7.0+ events the death toll for the year was only 181. Japan displayed many events and there were clusters of quakes in parts of Latin America.

Overall

By death toll 

 Note: At least 10 casualties

By magnitude 

 Note: At least 7.0 magnitude

Notable events

January

February

March

April

June

July

August

September

October

November

References

1916
 
1916